Hypotaxis is the grammatical arrangement of functionally similar but "unequal" constructs (from Greek hypo- "beneath", and taxis "arrangement"); certain constructs have more importance than others inside a sentence.

A common example of  syntactic expression of hypotaxis is the subordination of one syntactic unit to another in a complex sentence. 

Another example is observed in premodification. In the phrase "inexpensive composite materials",  "composite" modifies "materials" while "inexpensive" modifies the complex head "composite materials", rather than "composite" or "materials". In this example the phrase units are hierarchically structured, rather than being on the same level, as compared to the example "Cockroaches love warm, damp, dark places." Note the syntactic difference; hypotactic modifiers cannot be separated by a comma.

John Keats's "Ode to a Nightingale" has an example of hypotaxis in the second stanza: "O, for a draught of vintage! That hath been/ Cool'd a long age in the deep-delved earth, / Tasting of Flora and the country green" (1. 11–13). The "draught of vintage" is modified by the clauses in the successive lines.

In William Blake's poem "The Clod and the Pebble", the phrase "So sang a little Clod of Clay,/ Trodden with the cattle's feet" (l. 5–6) is an example of hypotaxis; line 6 modifies the "Clod of Clay" in line 5.

See also
Parataxis

References

Grammar